Arthur Stanley Roe was a medical doctor from Queensland, Australia, and the first Rhodes Scholar from that state when he was awarded the scholarship in 1904 at Brisbane Grammar School. He attended Balliol College at Oxford.

He was the son of the first vice-chancellor of the University of Queensland, Reginald Heber Roe.

References

Australian Rhodes Scholars
Year of death missing
Year of birth missing